Michaela Savić (born 14 March 1991, Helsingborg, Skåne) is a Swedish beauty pageant titleholder and model. Savić is Miss Universe Sweden 2010. She attended Miss Universe 2010 in Las Vegas on 23 August. She has been a model since the age of 14 and attended to several castings, plays and fashion shows. Savic placed second in Miss Universe Sweden 2009, behind Renate Cerljen. Savić is the second Miss Universe Sweden to represent Sweden in Miss Universe since the Miss Sweden pageant lost the right for the international final in 2009.

References

External links 
Michaela Savic official website

1991 births
Living people
Miss Universe 2010 contestants
People from Helsingborg
Swedish beauty pageant winners
Swedish female models
Swedish people of Serbian descent